Yisa is a Nigerian and Chinese name that may refer to
Given name
Yisa Braimoh (born 1942), Nigerian politician 
Yisa Sofoluwe (born 1967), Nigerian football defender
Yisa Yu (born 1983), Chinese singer

Surname
John Nmadu Yisa-Doko (born 1942), Nigerian Air Force Chief of Staff